Mohamed Moftah Zaïd Abulkhir (born 4 March 1987 in Tripoli) is a Libyan basketball player.

Career
Abulkhir was part of the Libya national basketball team at AfroBasket 2009, where he averaged 4 points per game over 8 games.

References

External links

1987 births
Living people
People from Tripoli, Libya
Libyan men's basketball players
21st-century Libyan people